Artimus Lamont Gardison Bentley (October 25, 1973 – January 19, 2005) was an American actor and rapper best known for his role as Hakeem Campbell on the UPN sitcom Moesha and the spin-off The Parkers. Bentley was also known for his role as Crazy K in the 1995 horror film Tales from the Hood and C-Money in the 2001 film The Wash featuring Dr. Dre and Snoop Dogg.

Early life 
Lamont Bentley was born in Milwaukee, Wisconsin on October 25, 1973, the son of Loyce Bentley Lamont grew up on Milwaukee's north side of town and attended Webster Middle School. He moved to Los Angeles with Loyce, who wished to pursue a career as a professional singer. He was called "Cuz" and "My Guy" by his friends.

Career 
Bentley dropped out of high school to pursue his own acting career, and had practiced autographs by the age of 12. He had to take odd jobs in movie theaters, a fish market, and a grocery store, among other places as he waited for his big break. His appearance enabled him to play the part of teens even into his twenties, and he landed a variety of small parts in television series and movies before landing bigger roles.

Debuting in a 1986 Starburst commercial, he began his career as a child actor appearing in television commercials and guest spots on various television series before landing a role on the short-lived but critically acclaimed television series South Central in 1994. His first feature film role came in the 1995 horror movie Tales from the Hood, about the inner-city ganglands, an anthology of four stories focused on the consequences of the gang lifestyle. In that particular film, he played Crazy K a cold and angry character.  He once played a teenage father who opted to stay home with his child instead of turn out for the high school football team in a public service television announcement. In 1995, South Central creator Ralph Farquhar cast Bentley in the series Moesha as Hakeem Campbell, the always hungry friend of Moesha, which ran for six seasons on UPN.

After Moesha ended, Bentley continued acting while pursuing a career as a rapper in the highly anticipated recording group UPRIZE with Marché Meeks aka "Cartier" and Tyson Pearson "Typhoon".  In 2001, he appeared as C-Money in The Wash opposite Dr. Dre and Snoop Dogg. That same year, he portrayed Tupac Shakur in the television biopic Too Legit: The MC Hammer Story. Bentley made one of his last onscreen appearances in Spike Lee's crime drama Sucker Free City.

Death 
Shortly after midnight on January 19, 2005, Bentley was driving alone when he was killed in a single-car accident in southern California's Ventura County. He was driving on Highway 118 near Simi Valley (30 miles northwest of Los Angeles). Witnesses to the accident stated that Bentley's vehicle was travelling at a high speed towards the Rocky Peak Fire Road off ramp. After running through a stop sign, the vehicle went through a chain-link fence situated across the street and rolled down an embankment. Bentley was ejected from the vehicle into traffic where five cars struck him. He sustained multiple blunt force injuries and was pronounced dead at 12:23 a.m. Bentley was survived by his two daughters and his mother Loyce Bentley .

A memorial service for Bentley was held at Forest Lawn Memorial Home in Hollywood Hills, on January 24, 2005. He was buried at Forest Lawn Memorial Park, Hollywood Hills.

Filmography

References

External links 

1973 births
2005 deaths
20th-century American male actors
21st-century American male actors
Male actors from Milwaukee
American male film actors
African-American male rappers
American male child actors
Burials at Forest Lawn Memorial Park (Hollywood Hills)
Musicians from Milwaukee
Road incident deaths in California
African-American male actors
American male television actors
People from Granada Hills, Los Angeles
20th-century American male musicians
20th-century African-American musicians
21st-century African-American people